is a Japanese short track speed skater, who won a bronze medal in the 5000 m relay at the 1992 Winter Olympics together with teammates Yuichi Akasaka, Tatsuyoshi Ishihara and Toshinobu Kawai. Kawasaki was also the flag bearer for the Japanese team at the game.

External links
 
 
Tsutomu Kawasaki at ISU
 Tsutomu Kawasaki at the-sports.org

1969 births
Living people
Japanese male short track speed skaters
Olympic short track speed skaters of Japan
Olympic medalists in short track speed skating
Olympic bronze medalists for Japan
Short track speed skaters at the 1992 Winter Olympics
Medalists at the 1992 Winter Olympics
20th-century Japanese people